The Spiral Road is a 1962 American adventure-drama film directed by Robert Mulligan and starring Rock Hudson, Burl Ives, Gena Rowlands, and Geoffrey Keen. The film was released by Universal-International in the United States in 1962, the same year that Mulligan's other movie To Kill a Mockingbird became a critical and commercial success.

The movie was filmed in Suriname and was shot in Eastmancolor.

Plot
Dr. Anton Drager travels to Java to study the effects of leprosy under an expert on the subject, Dr. Brits Jansen. The two physicians have many of the same views scientifically, but are philosophically a mismatch because of Drager's atheism and Jansen's Christianity.

After being married to his sweetheart Els, Drager must trek into the jungle to track down Frolick, a drunken river master who is lost. Frolick has been driven mad by a shaman called Burubi. Drager eventually comes across Frolick, but ends up killing him in self-defense.

After rescuing another doctor, in the same region, Anton becomes lost in the wild. He nearly dies and has lapsed into a coma by the time he is rescued. Drager's ordeal comes to change his perceptions, turning him into a Christian.

Cast
 Rock Hudson as Dr. Anton Drager
 Burl Ives as Dr. Brits Jansen
 Gena Rowlands as Els Van Duin
 Geoffrey Keen as Willem Wattereus
 Neva Patterson as Louise Kramer
 Will Kuluva as Dr. Sordjano
 Philip Abbott as Harry Frolick
 Larry Gates as Dr. Kramer
 Karl Swenson as Inspector Bevers
 Edgar Stehli as The Sultan
 Judy Dan as Laja
 Robert F. Simon as Dr. Martens
 Ibrahim Pendek as Stegomyia (as Ibrahim Bin Hassan)
 Reggie Nalder as Burubi 
 Leon Lontoc as Dr. Hatta
 David Lewis as Maj. Vlormans
 Parley Baer as Mr. Boosmans
 Fredd Wayne as Van Bloor
 Leslie Bradley as Krasser
 Barbara Morrison as Mrs. Boosmans
 Martin Brandt as Dr. Sander

Reception
While many critics and audiences were impressed with the setting and scenery of the film, there was general consensus that the script was lacking and that Mulligan's other films, particularly To Kill a Mockingbird, were better.

Michael E. Grost of Classic Film and Television wrote: "Weird but wildly inventive tale of doctors in the jungle, with good visuals."

Home media 
Universal released this film on DVD in 2006 as part of the 'Rock Hudson Screen Legend Collection, a three-disc set featuring four other films (Has Anybody Seen My Gal?, A Very Special Favor, The Golden Blade, and The Last Sunset''). Universal then re-released this film in 2015 as a stand-alone DVD as part of its Universal Vault Series. There is also a Region 2 DVD release of this film.

See also
 List of American films of 1962

References

External links
 
 
 

Films based on Dutch novels
1962 films
1962 drama films
1960s English-language films
Films directed by Robert Mulligan
Universal Pictures films
Films scored by Jerry Goldsmith
American drama films
Films shot in Suriname
Films set in Indonesia
1960s American films